The 1968 European Karate Championships, the 3rd edition, was held in the sports complex of Coubertine Hall in Paris, France from May 2 to 4, 1968.

Medalists

Medal table

References

1968
International sports competitions hosted by France
European Karate Championships
European Championships, 1968
International sports competitions hosted by Paris
European Karate Championships
European Championships, 1968
May 1968 sports events in Europe